Lelia Kym Carter Begel (born March 12, 1964, in Inglewood, California), also known as Kym Carter, is a former heptathlete from the United States, who represented her native country at the 1992 Summer Olympics in Barcelona, Spain. There she finished in eleventh place.

Carter is the executive director of the Carl Lewis Foundation, and a board member of Sound Body Sound Mind, a program to increase physical fitness in high schools. She is the mother of twins.

Education
 Wichita High School East, class of 1982
 University of Houston
 Louisiana State University

Corporate sponsors
 Nike, Inc.
 Reebok

IAAF World Indoor Championships
 Silver medal in the pentathlon at the 1995 IAAF World Indoor Championships
 Bronze medal in the pentathlon at the 1997 IAAF World Indoor Championships

Notable achievements
In 1993, she earned her first World Ranking (No. 8) in the heptathlon and ended the season ranked number 1. It was the first time since 1985 that another American outranked Jackie Joyner-Kersee in the multi except for 1989 when Joyner-Kersee didn't compete.

In 1982, while at Wichita East High School (the same high school as national record holder in the mile, Jim Ryun, she set the NFHS national high school record in the high jump at 6' 2 1/4".  The record lasted for three years.

References
Citations

Sources
 Kym Carter profile at USATF
 Sound Body Sound Mind profile

1964 births
Living people
Sportspeople from Inglewood, California
Track and field athletes from California
American heptathletes
African-American female track and field athletes
Olympic track and field athletes of the United States
Athletes (track and field) at the 1992 Summer Olympics
World Athletics Championships athletes for the United States
Houston Cougars women's track and field athletes
LSU Lady Tigers track and field athletes
21st-century African-American people
21st-century African-American women
20th-century African-American sportspeople
20th-century African-American women
20th-century African-American people